The House of Matsch, also written Maetsch, Mätsch, Metsch or Mazzo (Italian) is an old Swiss-Austrian noble family. Their origin is uncertain; they may have come from the Upper Valtellina from the village of Mazzo or may have been a sideline of the lords of Tarasp. The seats of the lords of Matsch were the castles of Obermatsch and Untermatsch in the Matscher Tal (Matsch Valley, Val di Mazia). Later they captured the Churburg at Schluderns in the Vinschgau (Venosta) valley and turned that into their main residence. For a time the lords of Matsch were one of the most powerful noble families in the Vinschgau and in present-day Graubünden.

History

The Matsch were documented for the first time around the middle of the 12th century. A certain Egino I von Matsch (*c.1160) is regarded as the founder of the family. The Matsch officiated as bailiffs over the monasteries of Marienberg in Burgeis and St. John in Müstair. The Matsch are therefore often referred to as bailiffs of mud. Later they also acquired the bailiwicks over the subjects of the bishop of Chur in Vinschgau, Münstertal, in the Lower Engadin and in Puschlav. The Matsch were almost constantly feuding with the bishops of Chur , of whom the Matsch were ministeriales .

The Matscher's own estates were in Vinschgau, Veltlin, Münstertal, Puschlav ( mines) and around Tarasp. In the 13th and 14th centuries, they came into the possession of the Lordship of Vaduz for a time as a pledge. They were also able to take possession of the castles and estates of Reichenberg, Ramosch,  Ardez, Greifenstein, Alt-Süns in Domleschg and Klingenhorn near Malans. In 1338 they took over the courts of Schiers and Castels in the Prättigau. A long-standing dispute between the Counts of Toggenburg and the Matsch family over the ownership of the two courts was only resolved through the marriage of Elizabeth of Matsch to Frederick VII, Count of Toggenburg. Through the marriage, the Matsch were drawn into the Old Zurich War. In 1348 the family lost the bailiwicks of Chiavenna, Bormio and the Puschlav to the Duchy of Milan.

Like many other Graubünden noble families, the Matsch family was constantly involved in feuds and conflicts with other families and the bishops of Chur.

Ulrich IV, Lord of Matsch acquired the County of Kirchberg near Ulm, through his wife Agnes in 1366, and therefore held the title Count of Kirchberg. He was also Vogt of Matsch. From Ulrich IV onwards, some members of the family were also provincial governors of Tyrol; the last representative of the family, Gaudenz, Lord of Matsch (1436–1504), belonged to the council of Sigismund, Archduke of Austria, regent of Tyrol and Further Austria. In 1487 he fell out of favor and, as a fugitive, lost his possessions through confiscation and pledging.

Most of the Matsch possessions in today's South Tyrol fell to the Barons von Trapp .

Coat of arms
The coat of arms of the von Matsch family has three transverse blue eagle wings in silver. On the helmet with red and silver covers a red and silver inturned hifthorn with shackles in mixed colors. It can be found under the original spelling "MAeTSCH" on the Zurich coat of arms roll.

Lords of Matsch

House of Matsch

Family tree
Descent (among others after Justinian Ladurner):

1. Hartwig I of Matsch († after 1167).
 1. Ulrich I of Matsch (* 1161).
 1. Arnold von Matsch († 1221), Bishop of Chur (from 1209/10).
 2. Egino I. Vogt von Matsch and the monastery of Marienberg (1160-1192); Heir of the Matsch bailiffs.
 1. Egino II Vogt von Matsch and Marienberg, (* 1189; † November 25, 1238) ∞ Adelheid von Wangen, daughter of Albero von Wangen.
 1. Hartwig II Vogt von Matsch and Marienberg (* 1214; † December 20, 1249) ∞ Sophie von Moosburg.
 1. Albero I Vogt von Matsch (* 1242; † Jan. 10, 1280) ∞ Sophie von Velturns († after Aug. 10, 1308), daughter of Hugo von Velturns and Elisabeth von Eppan († 1273); their father was Ulrich, Count of Eppan († after 1233) from the noble family of Eppan .
 1. Ulrich II Vogt von Matsch (1273–1328) ∞ Margaretha of Vaz († after 1343), daughter of Walter V Herr von Vaz (from the Barons von Vaz family ), and the Liukarde von Kirchberg († May 24, 1326); whose parents were Eberhard III, Count von Kirchberg († before 1283) and Uta von Neuffen (from the Neuffen family).
 1. Offmei Utehild von Matsch (* 1301; † after 1353) ∞ Albert II, Count of Gorizia († 1327).
 2. Ulrich III. Vogt von Marienberg and Chur, pledgee of Vaduz and Greifenstein († Oct. 25, 1366) ∞ Adelheid von Werdenberg († 1365) from the Alpeck side line of the Counts of Werdenberg-Sargans .
 1. Ulrich IV Vogt von Matsch and first Count of Kirchberg (1349–1402), Governor of Tyrol 1361–1363 ∞ Agnes Countess of Kirchberg († 1401).
 1. Ulrich V. († 1396) ∞ Cunigunde Countess of Monfort-Tetnang.
 1. Ulrich VII (1396-1431), Governor of Tyrol 1410-1411 and 1429-1431.
 2. Wilhelm († 1429), ducal Governor of Trento 1408, governor of Tyrol 1417-1429.
 2. Johann II († 1397) ∞ Margareth, Baroness of Rhäzüns.
 1. Ulrich VIII (1396–1461), governor of Tyrol 1431–1448, 1446–1448 also steward ∞ Teela von Freundsberg († 1439).
 3. Elisabeth († after 1443 ) ∞ Frederick VII Count of Toggenburg († 1436).
 4. Ulrich VI Count of Matsch († 1444) ∞ Barbara von Starkenberg († 1425); Daughter of Sigmund von Starkenberg († 1401) and Osanna von Ems († after 1418) [3] († 1407), granddaughter of the knight Ulrich I von Ems from the house of the Lords of Ems and a daughter from the noble family Schellenberg .
 1. Ulrich IX Count of Kirchberg and Matsch (1419–1489), governor of Tyrol 1471–1476 ∞ Agnes Countess of Kirchberg-Udalriching and Werdenberg-Sargans (4th great-granddaughter of the above-mentioned Eberhard III. of Kirchberg and Uta von Neuffen).
 1. Gaudenz von Matsch (1436-1504), governor of Tyrol 1478-1482, steward and general in the Venetian War of 1486; last male offspring of the Matscher.

Important members of the family 
 Egino I of Matsch (1160–1192)
 Arnold of Matsch, Bishop of Chur (1210–1221)
 Elizabeth of Matsch (died after 1443), later widow of Frederick VII, the last Count of Toggenburg
 Gaudenz of Matsch (1436–1504)

References

Sources 
 Justinian Ladurner, Die Vögte von Matsch, später auch Grafen von Kirchberg, in: Zeitschrift des Ferdinandeums für Tirol und Vorarlberg, 1st Section: Issue 16 (1871), pp. 5–292; 2nd Section: Issue 17 (1872), pp. 1–235; 3rd Section: Issue 18 (1874), pp. 7–158.

External links 
 
 
 
 Historisches Lexikon Bayerns: Kirchberg, Grafen von (Sarah Hadry)

Swiss noble families
Austrian noble families
People from Graubünden
History of Graubünden